Shefi Yishai is an Israeli musician, mostly active as composer and musical director for theater.

Shefi Wrote music to songs written by well-known Israeli poets - Nathan Zach, Yehuda Amichai, Yona Wallach, Ronny Someck. Released one solo album: "Love and Hate" and worked on albums by many other artists, including David Broza and Yehuda Poliker, as session musician and producer. On stage he played with Yehuda Poliker, Mami rock Opera and Ehud Banai. 
These days Shefi is on a tour featuring the music of his two solo albums.

Works

Albums
In 1986, he released an Album named "Under the Closet"  which is based on poems for children by Anda Amir Pinkerfeld, with Shefi's music, performed by Yehudit Tamir, Moti Dichne, Ya'akov Banai and Shefi Yishai.
His first solo album, Love and Hate,  was released on 1991.  It contains a selection of poems by the greatest Israeli poets with music by Shefi Yishai and performed by him.
His Second solo album, "A Man Would Not Talk About It" was released in 2010

Music for Theater
 Sanjer, Closer, Cruel and Tender - Habima Theater
 Bracha - Beer Sheva Theater
 The Last Striptease, Night Play - Tsavta Theater.
 Schneider & Schuster - Basel Theater (Switzerland)
 The Concert, The Rise and Fall of Little Voice, Headlines News - Beit Lesin Theater
 Revieue Lanoar / The Israeli Children theater
 Nice Tony, Killer Joe, Blue Remembered Hills, Sky, Some Voices, Little Malcolm and his struggle against the eunuchs, Glengarry Glen Ross, Crime - The Han Theater
 Brighton Beach Memoires - Haifa Theater
 God, Crocodiles, Marriage Play, Moon of Alabama, Kol Nidrei - Herzliya Theater.
 Perfect Days, The Last Summer - Beer Sheba Theater.
 Victims of Duty - Hazira Theater.
 Love and Anger - Herzliya Theater.
 The last hour of Kol - Tmuna Theater.

Musical Director
 The Jerusalem Sindrom - Haifa Theater.
 Mami (Rock Opera) - Tsavta Theater and Habima Theater.

External links
  Official site
   MYSPACE
 FACEBOOK

21st-century Israeli male singers
Israeli composers
Year of birth missing (living people)
Living people
20th-century Israeli male singers